Tinyaq (Quechua tinya a kind of drum, -q a suffix, also spelled Tinyacc) or Quri Willka (Quechua quri gold, willka  minor god in the Inca culture, an image of the Willkanuta valley worshipped as God; grandchild; great-grandson; lineage; holy, sacred, divine, willka or wilka Anadenanthera colubrina (a tree), also spelled Qoriwillka) is an archaeological site  in Peru with storehouses of the Inca period on a mountain named Tinyaq. It is located in the Ayacucho Region, Huanta Province, Iguain District.

References 

Archaeological sites in Peru
Archaeological sites in Ayacucho Region
Mountains of Peru
Mountains of Ayacucho Region